Ian Buchanan (born 16 June 1957) is a Scottish television actor who has appeared on multiple American soap operas including General Hospital, Port Charles, The Bold and the Beautiful, All My Children, and Days of Our Lives. He is also known for his work in two David Lynch shows - playing Dick Tremayne in Twin Peaks and Lester Guy in On the Air.

Career
Buchanan was born in Hamilton, South Lanarkshire. After studying acting in New York at the Lee Strasberg Theatre Institute and privately with Marcia Haufrecht, Buchanan's first major daytime role came in 1986, when he joined the cast of General Hospital in the role of Duke Lavery, whom he portrayed until 1989. After leaving the role of Lavery, Buchanan appeared in roles on prime-time series including It's Garry Shandling's Show as Ian McFyfer from 1988 to 1990, and Twin Peaks as Dick Tremayne from 1990 to 1991.

In 1990, he played Sean Brantley, a wealthy Playboy-style magazine publisher in the Columbo television series episode Columbo Cries Wolf. He also guest-starred in episode 4 of the 1990 series The Flash as the main villain, Stan Kovacs. He appeared in a 1993 episode of Quantum Leap, titled "Blood Moon."

In 1993, Buchanan returned to daytime and was cast on The Bold and the Beautiful in his second most recognized daytime role as Dr. James Warwick, which he portrayed until 1999. Buchanan has since reprised his role as Warwick in several guest appearances from 2004 to 2011. Following the end of his regular appearance as Warwick, Buchanan made a short appearance on Days of Our Lives in 2001 as Lord Sheraton.

In 2002, he joined the cast of Port Charles portraying the sinister Joshua Temple until the show's end in 2003.

In 2005, Buchanan joined the cast of All My Children, in the role of Dr. Greg Madden, a fertility specialist involved in the controversial "un-abortion" storyline involving Erica Kane (Susan Lucci), as well as the abduction of the daughter of Dixie Martin (Cady McClain) and Tad Martin (Michael E. Knight). Buchanan's role as Madden came to an end on 5 July 2006, when his character died as the result of being buried alive.

In 2012, Buchanan joined Days of Our Lives in the newly created contract role of Ian McAllister, who is the husband of Madison James (Sarah Brown) and a former lover of Kate Roberts DiMera, (Lauren Koslow), but was let go in August, as the result of a shift in the direction of the series.

On 27 August 2012, Buchanan returned to General Hospital as Duke Lavery after a 23-year absence. On 12 November, it was revealed that Buchanan was playing a dual role. "Duke Lavery" was actually Cesar Faison in disguise, and Faison was holding the real Duke hostage at a clinic in Lucerne, Switzerland. On 5 July 2017, it was announced he would reprise his role as James Warwick on The Bold and the Beautiful.

Filmography
n.b. for credit listings reference

Film

Television

Awards and nominations

References

External links

Ian Buchanan profile from SoapCentral
AnnaandDuke.com
Ian Buchanan on Tramedibeautiful.com

1957 births
Living people
People from Hamilton, South Lanarkshire
Scottish male television actors
Scottish male soap opera actors
Daytime Emmy Award winners
Daytime Emmy Award for Outstanding Supporting Actor in a Drama Series winners
Scottish emigrants to the United States
Scottish male film actors